is a passenger railway station in the city of Sodegaura, Chiba Prefecture, Japan, operated by the East Japan Railway Company (JR East).

Lines
Nagaura Station is served by the Uchibo Line, and lies 20.5 km from the starting point of the Uchibo Line at Soga Station.

Layout
The station consists of a single island platform serving two tracks, connected to the wooden station building by a footbridge. The station is staffed.

Platforms

History
Nagaura Station opened on January 10, 1947, as a station on the Japanese National Railways (JNR) Bōsōnishi Line. The line was renamed the Uchibō Line from July 15, 1972. The Nagaura Station was absorbed into the JR East network upon the privatization of JNR on April 1, 1987.

Passenger statistics
In fiscal 2019, the station was used by an average of 6084 passengers daily (boarding passengers only).

Surrounding area
 
 Nagaura Post Office

See also
 List of railway stations in Japan

References

External links

 JR East Station information 

Railway stations in Chiba Prefecture
Railway stations in Japan opened in 1947
Uchibō Line
Sodegaura